"Stars" is a song by the Cranberries from the compilation album Stars: The Best of 1992-2002, and was released in October 2002. It is the band's last single released before their six-year hiatus. The music video was directed by Jake Nava.

Track listing
 "Stars" – 3:30
 "Dreaming My Dreams" – 3:37
 "Sunday" – 3:30
 "Hollywood" – 5:08

Personnel
Dolores O'Riordan – lead vocals, guitars
Noel Hogan – lead guitars
Mike Hogan – bass guitar
Fergal Lawler – drums, percussion

Charts

References

The Cranberries songs
Music videos directed by Jake Nava
Songs written by Dolores O'Riordan
2002 singles
Song recordings produced by Stephen Street